Estadio La Arboleda is a multi-use stadium in the Santísima Trinidad neighborhood of Asunción, Paraguay.  It is the home ground of the Club Rubio Ñú of the División Intermedia, the second tier professional football league in Paraguay. The stadium holds 8,000 spectators and opened in 1970.

External links
information

Multi-purpose stadiums in Paraguay
Football venues in Asunción
Sports venues in Asunción
Estadio La Arboleda